Putih Abu-Abu dan Sepatu Kets is an Indonesian drama film released on October 29, 2009, directed by Nayato Fio Nuala and produced by Firman Bintang. It starring by Arumi Bachsin, Adipati Koesmadji, Michella Putri, Rendy Septino, Rana Audi Marissa, Fildha Elishandi, and Steven William.

References

External links

 Review at Cineplex

2009 films
Indonesian drama films
2000s Indonesian-language films
Films shot in Indonesia
Films set in Indonesia
Films directed by Nayato Fio Nuala